The 1971 Italian Open – Men's singles was an event of the 1971 Italian Open tennis tournament and was played at the Foro Italico in Rome, Italy from 3 May through 10 May 1971. Ilie Năstase was the defending champion but did not compete in this edition. Fourth-seeded Rod Laver claimed the singles title, defeating  Jan Kodeš in the final, 4–6, 6–3, 7–5, 6–4.

Seeds

  John Newcombe (quarterfinals)
  Arthur Ashe (semifinals)
  Cliff Drysdale (quarterfinals)
  Rod Laver (champion)
  Stan Smith (quarterfinals)
  Tom Okker (semifinals)
  Roy Emerson (quarterfinals)
  Tony Roche (third round)

Draw

Finals

Top half

Section 1

Section 2

Bottom half

Section 3

Section 4

References

External links
 ITF tournament edition details

1971 Italian Open (tennis)